APDA may refer to:

 American Parliamentary Debate Association
 Adult patent ductus arteriosus, a congenital heart disease
 American Parkinson Disease Association
 The Apple Programmers and Developer's Association